Caloptilia thymophanes is a moth of the family Gracillariidae. It is known from Bihar, India.

The larvae feed on Lannea coromandelica and Odina wodier. They mine the leaves of their host plant.

References

thymophanes
Moths of Asia
Moths described in 1928